The 2009 PBZ Zagreb Indoors was an ATP tennis tournament played on hard courts indoors. It was the 4th edition of the PBZ Zagreb Indoors, and part of the ATP World Tour 250 series of the 2009 ATP World Tour. It took place in Zagreb, Croatia from February 2 through February 8, 2009.

The singles line up was led by world no. 19 Igor Andreev and Croats Marin Čilić and Ivo Karlović. Also competing were Paul-Henri Mathieu, Jürgen Melzer, Andreas Seppi, Mario Ančić and Simone Bolelli.

Champions

Singles

 Marin Čilić defeated  Mario Ančić 6–3, 6–4
It was Cilic's 2nd title of the year and 3rd of his career.

Doubles

 Martin Damm /  Robert Lindstedt defeated   Christopher Kas /  Rogier Wassen 6–4, 6–3

External links
Official website
ATP Tournament Profile
Singles Draw
Doubles Draw
Qualifying Singles Draw

 
Zagreb Indoors
Zagreb
Pbz Zagreb Indoors, 2009